Critical Reviews in Immunology is a bimonthly scientific journal published by Begell House covering the field of immunology. The editor-in-chief is M. Zouhair Atassi.

Abstracting and indexing 
The journal is abstracted and indexed in BIOSIS Previews, Current Contents/Life Science, MEDLINE/PubMed, and the Science Citation Index. According to the Journal Citation Reports, its 2016 impact factor is 2.327, ranking it 106th out of 150 journals in the category "Immunology".

References

External links
 

Immunology journals
Bimonthly journals
English-language journals
Begell House academic journals